Marchois may refer to:
 Marchois dialect, a dialect of France
 Arnaud Marchois, French sportsman

See also 
 French Wiktionary entry for "marchois"